Mohammad Torkashvand ( born 25 January 1979, in Kermanshah) is an Iranian former volleyball player.
Torkashvand was one of Iran's volleyball stars.

Honours
Best Spiker: 1998 Asian Junior Championship
Best Spiker: 2002 Asian Club Championship
MVP: 2004 Asian Club Championship
Best Server: 2007 Asian Club Championship

References

FIVB Profile

Iranian men's volleyball players
Asian Games silver medalists for Iran
Asian Games medalists in volleyball
Volleyball players at the 2002 Asian Games
Volleyball players at the 2006 Asian Games
Medalists at the 2002 Asian Games
Sportspeople from Kermanshah
Islamic Solidarity Games competitors for Iran